Autumn Flowers, Rerolled is an album by Canadian rock group GrimSkunk released in 1997. It contains re-recorded versions of songs from the 1991 demo tape Autumn Flowers. Ben Fortier provides lead vocals on Pourquoi pourquoi ne pas fumer and backing vocals on Zig Zag and Rhinoceros. Backing vocals on Mange d'la marde are featured by Vincent Peake, from former group Groovy Aardvark, Shantal Arroyo, from Overbass and Uncle Costa from Blood Sausage.  The twelfth track is the original demo tape Autumn Flowers (1991), which is very rare to no more available.

Track listing 
Pourquoi pourquoi ne pas fumer
Zig Zag
Rhinoceros
Spiderman
Vikings
Footsteps In Loyola
La légende d'Overhead
Gormenghast
Camptown Lady
Sensi
Mange d'la marde (live at Le Medley, October 4, 1996)
Autumn Flowers(original demo)

References 
Band à part profile

GrimSkunk albums
1997 albums
Indica Records albums